Now It Can Be Told: DEVO at the Palace is a live album released by American new wave band Devo, recorded during their 1988 "comeback tour" in promotion of the Total Devo album. It contains performances of several cuts from Total Devo but largely focuses on earlier material and also contains one exclusive song, "It Doesn't Matter to Me."

Song arrangements
The first part of the show was a semi-acoustic set, in which the band played heavily altered versions of earlier hits. The show's opener was an acoustic version of "Jocko Homo," which was now significantly slower and had a vocal melody change. The ballad-esque delivery of the song prompted Jerry Casale to exclaim, "I'll bet you didn't know that was such a sad song."

The next change was applied to "Going Under," which was performed in a style similar to the E-Z Listening Disc version.

The rest of the set was largely based on the original studio versions. (The only notable difference was in "Gut Feeling," where the fast "Slap Your Mammy" jam had been removed from the ending and was replaced by the song "Gates Of Steel.") The album's closing track is an eleven-minute medley of "Shout," "Somewhere" from West Side Story and "Disco Dancer." This is the second-longest track found in Devo's catalog and a longer studio version totaling eighteen minutes later appeared on the Recombo DNA rarities compilation. The studio version features a longer instrumental section and the addition of an older Devo song called "Social Fools."

Devo's performance of "Disco Dancer" is nearly identical to the remixed version heard in the song's music video.

The songs "Pity You" and "Beautiful World" were performed during the live set but are not included on the album.

Artwork
The cover art and tagline were based on the 1971 book The Beginning Was the End. Initial vinyl pressings were double LPs that contained three sides of music and a fourth "blank" side with etched signatures from the band. The label of the fourth side was marked, "ATTENTION SPUDS! NO GROOVE! DO NOT PLAY!"

Album length
The description of the album as containing "More than one hour of uncensored sonic proof" is a deliberate joke on the part of Devo. The album's length is 60 minutes and 1 second.

Track listing

Note
"Somewhere With Devo" includes an excerpt of "Somewhere" by Leonard Bernstein and Stephen Sondheim, but is not credited on the back cover and inner label.

Personnel
Credits adapted from the album liner notes.

Devo
Mark Mothersbaugh – vocals, keyboards, guitar
Gerald Casale – vocals, bass guitar, keyboards
Bob Casale – guitar, keyboards, backing vocals
Bob Mothersbaugh – guitar, backing vocals
David Kendrick – drums
Technical
Gerald Casale – producer, engineer, graphic concepts
Bob Casale – producer, engineer
Recorded by Westwood One
Biff Dawes – engineer 
Mark Mothersbaugh – graphic concepts
Patrick Pending – art direction

References

External links
 Devo Live Guide - Comprehensive guide to Devo's live performances.

Devo live albums
1989 live albums
Enigma Records live albums